Xanthocanace ranula, is a European species of Canacidae.

Distribution
Belgium, Denmark, England, Germany, Ireland, Italy, Spain and Canary Islands.

References

Canacidae
Diptera of Europe
Diptera of Africa
Insects described in 1874
Taxa named by Hermann Loew